is a Japanese professional boxer. He has held the WBC-OPBF super-bantamweight title since 2018 and previously the WBO Asia Pacific bantamweight title from 2017 to 2018. As of August 2020, he is ranked as the world's fourth best active super-bantamweight by BoxRec and seventh by The Ring.

Professional career
Teshigawara made his professional debut on 28 July 2011, scoring a third-round technical knockout (TKO) victory over Naoto Tabata at the Korakuen Hall in Tokyo, Japan.

After compiling a record of 14–2–2 (8 KOs) he challenged WBO Asia Pacific bantamweight champion Jetro Pabustan on 12 October 2017 at the Korakuen Hall. Teshigawara scored a knockdown in the ninth round. In the tenth, after Pabustan received a point deduction for excessive holding, the referee called a halt to the contest to save Pabustan from further punishment, awarding Teshigawara his first professional title via tenth-round TKO. At the time of the stoppage Teshigawara was ahead on all three judges' scorecards with 89–81, 88–82, and 87–83.

He began 2018 with two successful defences of his WBO regional title – a unanimous decision (UD) against Jason Canoy in February and a fifth-round knockout (KO) against Teiru Kinoshita in June – before moving up in weight to face Glenn Suminguit for the vacant WBC-OPBF super-bantamweight title on 11 October at the Korakuen Hall. Teshigawara captured his second professional title, defeating Suminguit via fifth-round KO.

He made three successful defences of his WBC regional title in 2019, scoring stoppage wins against Yuki Iriguchi in February; Shohei Omori in August; and Shohei Kawashima in December.

Professional boxing record

References

External links

Living people
1990 births
Sportspeople from Gunma Prefecture
Japanese male boxers
Bantamweight boxers
Super-bantamweight boxers